Cryptopsy is a Canadian technical death metal band from Montreal, formed in 1988.

History

Necrosis (1988–1992)
Necrosis was formed in April 1988 by drummer Mike Atkin, guitarist Steve Thibault and vocalist Dan "Lord Worm" Greening, initially under the name Obsessive Compulsive Disorder. John Todds later joined on bass. The band released several demos, including Mastication and Heterodontism (1989), Realms of Pathogenia (1991) and Necrosis (1992). Atkin left the band to continue more into the Speed metal/Thrash direction, and was replaced by Flo Mounier, at which time the band changed their name to "Cryptopsy". Todds left shortly thereafter, retiring from music to focus on his family; he was replaced by Kevin Weagle; Dave Galea also joined the band.

Blasphemy Made Flesh (1993–1995)
In 1993, Cryptopsy released their debut demo, Ungentle Exhumation. This demo caught the attention of local label Gore Records, which re-released the demo and, for a brief period, managed the band. The demo garnered attention in the Canadian death metal underground, as well as from the German label Invasion Records.

By 1994, bassist Kevin Weagle had been replaced by Martin Fergusson, and Dave Galea was replaced by lead guitarist Jon Levasseur. This line-up recorded their debut album, Blasphemy Made Flesh, which at first was independently released and later licensed to Invasion Records. The album gained them a wide following in the Canadian underground.

Due to financial problems of Invasion Records, Cryptopsy was left without a label to support their tour, but the album would be picked up by Dutch label Displeased Records. After successfully touring in support of Blasphemy Made Flesh, Steve Thibault left the band. Bassist Martin Fergusson was replaced by Eric Langlois. The addition of Langlois incorporated funk-style bass slaps into the Cryptopsy sound.

None So Vile (1996–1997)
In 1996, the line-up of Worm, Mounier, Levasseur, and Langlois released the album None So Vile on the Swedish label Wrong Again Records. By this time, Levasseur was a very prominent songwriter in the band. His guitar leads consisted of very fast yet complex shreds, which were usually played in short bursts. Although Levasseur handled all the guitar parts on the album, the band would add Miguel Roy as a second touring guitarist.

In 1997, after the tour in support of None So Vile, Lord Worm left the band, citing health issues. The band hired the Boston native Mike DiSalvo, vocalist of death metal band Infestation, (with the personal approval of Lord Worm). In July 1997, Cryptopsy's appearance at the Milwaukee Metalfest XI gained the attention of many American metalheads, as well as that of the label Century Media.

Whisper Supremacy (1998–1999)
Cryptopsy's next album, Whisper Supremacy, was released on Century Media in 1998, and featured Miguel Roy on second guitar. It took Cryptopsy's style further, incorporating some jazz and fusion elements. Some fans criticized Mike DiSalvo's vocal style, saying it was too similar to that of hardcore vocalists and preferring the more extreme death metal style of Lord Worm; others welcomed DiSalvo's intelligible lyrics and vocal presence. The tour in support of Whisper Supremacy took the band on their first tour through the United States, increasing their fan-base significantly.

…And Then You'll Beg (2001–2002)
Cryptopsy released their fourth studio effort, …And Then You'll Beg, in 2001. The album featured a new guitarist, Alex Auburn, who replaced Miguel Roy. And Then You'll Beg was viewed as being less extreme than Cryptopsy's previous albums. The album also incorporated even more progressive elements and was  considered to be very technical and experimental. After the first portion of the supporting tour, Mike DiSalvo departed the band. Martin LaCroix took over the position as singer for the European and Japanese tours. His style was viewed as being in between the styles of Lord Worm and Mike DiSalvo.

None So Live (2002–2004)
In June 2001, Cryptopsy played their first concert in their hometown of Montreal in four years and attracted an audience of more than 2,000. The concert was recorded and, in 2003, released as a live album, None So Live. This release was LaCroix's only contribution to Cryptopsy's discography; he was not fluent enough in English to write lyrics on the same level as his predecessors.

Lord Worm rejoined the band and through summer 2004, Cryptopsy played shows in the Montreal area, and began a full Canadian tour in September, with former guitarist Miguel Roy filling in for the unavailable Jon Levasseur. In October, Martyr and former Gorguts guitarist Dan Mongrain took over second guitar duties for the live dates. The setlist for this tour began with the entire None So Vile album, followed by songs from Blasphemy Made Flesh and Whisper Supremacy. The Canada 2004 tour ended at Cryptopsy's performance on November 6 at the Trois-Rivieres Metalfest IV, which was filmed for a live DVD. The DVD Live at Trois-Rivieres Metalfest IV was released in 2005.

Once Was Not (2005–2006)
On January 31, 2005, Jon Levasseur announced that he had lost interest in extreme music and amicably departed Cryptopsy. Dan Mongrain remained on guitar duties for the Back to the Worms tour through the United States from February to May. After the tour's completion Mongrain also departed in order to continue his work with Martyr. It was then announced that Cryptopsy's next album, Once Was Not, would be released on October 18, 2005. The album features original vocalist Lord Worm, Flo Mounier, Eric Langlois, and Alex Auburn handling all guitar duties except the intro track "Luminum". On September 28 it was announced that the new touring guitarist would be Christian Donaldson of Mythosis. The band toured North America with Suffocation, Despised Icon, and Aborted. After a break, and the release of Flo Mounier's instructional drumming DVD Extreme Metal Drumming 101, the band toured Europe with Grave, Aborted, Dew-Scented, and others, then toured America and Australia.  Following their second tour of Europe, UK, and Scandinavia, guitarist Christian Donaldson became a permanent member of the band.

The Unspoken King (2007–2011)
The new album was originally to be called The Book of Suffering, and was to be a double album, but on April 23, 2007, Cryptopsy announced that Lord Worm had been fired from the band and that they were looking for a new vocalist. After the announcement, Lord Worm stated that he left the group earlier than planned for health reasons, which contradicted the band's statement that he was kicked out. Lord Worm also stated that there were creative differences with the other band members over the direction the band would eventually take on their subsequent studio outing.

On December 4, 2007, Cryptopsy revealed the addition of vocalist Matt McGachy, of fellow Montreal heavy metal band 3 Mile Scream; and a new keyboard player, Maggy Durand. The band released a new studio album, The Unspoken King, on June 24, 2008. This album saw the inclusion of previously-unheard elements such as breakdowns and melodic riffs. The album has been widely regarded as being a deathcore release instead of the band's usual technical death metal style, and as such was met with a mixed-to-negative reaction from both fans and critics.

In early February 2009, guitarist Alex Auburn announced his departure from the band, saying that there were numerous reasons for his leaving, and that he and the rest of the band agreed with the departure.

Self-titled album and The Book of Suffering EP's (2011–present)
On May 25, 2011, the band announced on their Facebook page that former lead guitarist and major contributor Jon Levasseur had returned to the band. Additionally, bassist Eric Langlois decided to take a break from Cryptopsy, and Youri Raymond took his place on bass. On December 9, 2011, Raymond announced his departure from the band. On January 15, 2012, Cryptopsy announced that Olivier Pinard, from Neuraxis and Vengeful, would be the new bassist.

On September 14, 2012, Cryptopsy released Cryptopsy, which turned away from the experimentation witnessed on The Unspoken King, in favour of a more technical death metal sound.

On May 8, 2015, it was announced that Cryptopsy would release The Book of Suffering - Tome I in mid-2015, the first in a series of EPs. An Indiegogo campaign was launched the same day.  Regarding the recording process, it was stated that Jason Suecof would handle mixing duties, while Alan Douches would handle the mastering process.

On August 31, 2018, the band announced the second part of The Book of Suffering on their Facebook page. Pre-sales of the EP began on the 7th of September along with a music video of their new song "Sire of Sin", which was to appear on Tome II. The EP was released on October 26.

Members

Current 
 Flo Mounier – drums, backing vocals (1992–present)
 Christian Donaldson – lead guitar (2005–2011, 2012–present), rhythm guitar (2011–present)
 Matt McGachy – lead vocals (2007–present)
 Olivier Pinard – bass (2012–present)

Former 
 Mike Atkin – drums (1988–1992)
 John Todds – bass, backing vocals (1988–1992)
 Steve Thibault – rhythm guitar, backing vocals (1988–1995), lead guitar (1988–1992)
 Lord Worm – lead vocals (1988–1997, 2003–2007) (ex-Rage Nucléaire, ex-Necrosis)
 Dave Galea – lead guitar (1992–1993)
 Kevin Weagle – bass (1992–1994)
 Jon Levasseur – lead guitar (1993–2005, 2011–2012)
 Martin Fergusson – bass (1994)
 Miguel Roy – rhythm guitar (1995–1999)
 Eric Langlois – bass (1995–2011)
 Mike DiSalvo – lead vocals (1997–2001) (Coma Cluster Void, Akurion, Conflux, ex-Infestation, ex-Mabbus)
 Alex Auburn – rhythm guitar, co-lead vocals (1999–2009)
 Martin Lacroix – lead vocals (2001–2003) (ex-Serocs, ex-Spasme)
 Daniel Mongrain – lead guitar (2004-2005 touring)
 Maggy Durand – keyboards (2007–2008)
 Youri Raymond – rhythm guitar (2009–2011), bass (2011), backing vocals (2009–2011)
 Dominic Grimard – bass (2018-2019)

Timeline

Discography

Studio albums
Blasphemy Made Flesh (1994)
None So Vile (1996)
Whisper Supremacy (1998)
...And Then You'll Beg (2000)
Once Was Not (2005)
The Unspoken King (2008)
Cryptopsy (2012)

EPs
The Book of Suffering – Tome I (2015)
The Book of Suffering – Tome II (2018)

Live albums
None So Live (2003)

Demos
Ungentle Exhumation (1993)

Compilations
The Best of Us Bleed (2012)

References

External links
 Official website
 Facebook

1988 establishments in Quebec
Canadian death metal musical groups
Canadian technical death metal musical groups
Century Media Records artists
Deathcore musical groups
Musical groups established in 1988
Musical groups from Montreal
Musical quartets